This is a list of the Celestial Masters, leaders of Zhengyi Dao, continuing Wudoumi Dao (Way of the Five Pecks of Rice). After the death of the 64th Celestial Master Zhang Yuanxian in 2008, controversy arose over the legitimate succession, with different descendants claiming to be the rightful 65th Celestial Master, including Zhang Jintao and three other claimants in China mainland; and Zhang Yijiang and Zhang Meiliang in Taiwan. Another Taiwanese master, Zhang Daochen, claims to be the legitimate 64th Celestial Master, as, according to him, Zhang Yuanxian wasn't. In English the Celestial Master was also known as the "Taoist pontiff".

Notes

External links
The Taoist Association of Celestial Master Chang Website of 65th Celestial Master (claimant)

Chinese Taoists
Taoism-related lists
Taoist religious leaders
Taoist priesthood
List
Chinese families